Andy Cadiff is an American producer and television director.

Born in Newton, Massachusetts, Cadiff attended the Belmont Hill School, where he graduated in 1973. He then attended Harvard University, and later moved to New York. Cadiff began his career in 1978, where he worked as an assistant stage manager for the Broadway play On The Twentieth Century. He then worked on the play Evita in 1979. Cadiff made his debut as director on the play Mail in 1988. In the same year, he was director for one episode of the sitcom television series Eisenhower and Lutz. Cadiff then made his producing debut in 1989 as producer for three episodes of the sitcom television series FM. His directing credits include Quantum Leap, According to Jim, George Lopez, My Wife and Kids, Home Improvement, Hot in Cleveland, Last Man Standing, Growing Pains and Spin City.

In 1997 Cadiff was director on the film Leave It to Beaver. He then directed Chasing Liberty and A Bunch of Amateurs.

References

External links 

Living people
Year of birth missing (living people)
People from Newton, Massachusetts
Television producers from Massachusetts
American television producers
American film directors
American television directors
American theatre directors
Harvard University alumni
Stage managers